Positivo Tecnologia, known as Positivo, started in 1989 under the name Positivo Informatica until 2017. It is a Brazilian technology company headquartered in Curitiba, Paraná. It is the Information Technology division of Brazilian holding organization Grupo Positivo.

Nowadays, the product portfolio includes smartphones, laptops, computer servers, tablets, payment solutions, gadgets for smart homes and offices, electronic ballots, set-top box for Brazilian digital television and educational software used in more than 40 countries. The company also serves as an OEM/ODM/EMS.

It is listed on the Novo Mercado of B3.

Market

Brazil market share
16.1% total PC sales (2009)
24.7% official market sales (2009)
29.9% retail market share

Target market
Target market segmentation is based on families with a low monthly budget and their need to buy a personal computer. The low-cost configurations combined with long-term financing allowed the company to build a national coverage and distribution model in 2004, selling the products in major retail companies throughout Brazil.  These are designed to serve both as a TV and a personal computer.

Positivo Tecnologia has diversified contracts with the Brazilian government for electronic ballots to reduce its dependence on computer sales and variations in the economy.

Products/Services
According to Grupo Positivo, Positivo Tecnologia:
Manufactures microcomputers.
Manufactures mobile phones, including smartphones.
Develops education software.
Runs education portals.
Provides teacher training and educational and technical support for Grupo Positivo partner schools.

References

Companies based in Curitiba
Companies established in 1989
Computer hardware companies
Software companies of Brazil
Electronics companies of Brazil
Companies listed on B3 (stock exchange)
Brazilian brands
Mobile phone manufacturers
Mobile phone companies of Brazil